Stemodene is a labdane-related diterpene whose corresponding terpene synthase has been discovered in rice and subsequently cloned and functionally characterized.  The gene responsible for stemodene production has not been found in the completed rice genome, thus suggesting that perhaps other genes are as yet undiscovered in the "completed" genome.  Stemarene synthase demonstrates high sequence homology with stemodene synthase, thus accounting for the latter's discovery by Dana Morrone in 2005. Additionally, the corresponding olefin produced by each cyclase shows structural similarities and is derived from the common precursor of syn-copalyl diphosphate.

References 

Diterpenes
Cyclopentanes